Virtue is the second studio album by American band the Voidz, released on March 30, 2018 through Cult and RCA. It is the band's first album after shortening their name from "Julian Casablancas + The Voidz" to “The Voidz.”

Production, promotion and release
On October 7, 2017, The Voidz played songs from Virtue for the first time during a secret show (billed as "YouTube Comments", a supposed Voidz tribute band) in Los Angeles, including "Wink", "ALieNNatioN", "We're Where We Were", "My Friend the Walls" and "Lazy Boy". The band also played "Wink" on the Brazilian talk show The Noite while on a tour of South America during the same month.

On December 8, 2017, the band released a teaser video directed by Warren Fu, announcing the album, the simplification of their name to The Voidz and also their signing to RCA. The video features snippets of the songs "Pointlessness" and "Pyramid of Bones", as well as the Les Paul and Mary Ford song "The World Is Waiting for the Sunrise".

The album's first single, "Leave It in My Dreams", was released on January 23, 2018, followed by a second single, "QYURRYUS", the next day. "Pointlessness", "All Wordz Are Made Up", and "ALieNNatioN" were then released respectively as the following singles, while a music video for "Pyramid of Bones" was released on March 29, 2018.

The album artwork features a 2015 painting by Argentinian-Spanish artist Felipe Pantone.

The track "Think Before You Drink" is an acoustic cover and rearrangement of a 1978 disco song by the musician Michael Cassidy. The band was inspired by a cover of the song performed by Hansadutta Swami.

Track listing

Charts

References

2018 albums
Cult Records albums